Ognjen "Olja" Petrović (Serbian Cyrillic: Огњен Оља Петровић; 2 January 1948 – 21 September 2000) was a Serbian professional goalkeeper who played at Euro 76 for SFR Yugoslavia.

References
 
 

1948 births
2000 deaths
Sportspeople from Kruševac
Serbian footballers
Yugoslav footballers
Yugoslavia international footballers
Association football goalkeepers
Yugoslav First League players
Red Star Belgrade footballers
Ligue 1 players
SC Bastia players
1974 FIFA World Cup players
UEFA Euro 1976 players
Serbian expatriate footballers
Expatriate footballers in France
Mediterranean Games gold medalists for Yugoslavia
Competitors at the 1971 Mediterranean Games
Mediterranean Games medalists in football